James Cerretani and Adil Shamasdin were the defending champions but lost in the first round to Henrique Cunha and F Romboli.

Kretschmer and Satschko won the title, defeating Nicolás Barrientos and Víctor Estrella Burgos in the final, 4–6, 7–5, [10–6].

Seeds

Draw

Draw

References
 Main Draw

Sao Paulo - Doubles
2014 Doubles
2014 in Brazilian tennis